Cowden syndrome (also known as Cowden's disease and multiple hamartoma syndrome) is an autosomal dominant inherited condition characterized by benign overgrowths called hamartomas as well as an increased lifetime risk of breast, thyroid, uterine, and other cancers. It is often underdiagnosed due to variability in disease presentation, but 99% of patients report mucocutaneous symptoms by age 20–29. Despite some considering it a primarily dermatologic condition, Cowden's syndrome is a multi-system disorder that also includes neurodevelopmental disorders such as macrocephaly.

The incidence of Cowden's disease is about 1 in 200,000, making it quite rare. Furthermore, early and continuous screening is essential in the management of this disorder to prevent malignancies. It is associated with mutations in PTEN on 10q23.3, a tumor suppressor gene otherwise known as phosphatase and tensin homolog, that results in dysregulation of the mTOR pathway leading to errors in cell proliferation, cell cycling, and apoptosis. The most common malignancies associated with the syndrome are adenocarcinoma of the breast (20%), followed by adenocarcinoma of the thyroid (7%), squamous cell carcinomas of the skin (4%), and the remaining from the colon, uterus, or others (1%).

Signs and symptoms

As Cowden's disease is a multi-system disorder, the physical manifestations are broken down by organ system:

Skin

Adolescent patients affected with Cowden syndrome develop characteristic lesions called trichilemmomas, which typically develop on the face, and verrucous papules around the mouth and on the ears. Oral papillomas are also common. Furthermore, shiny palmar keratoses with central dells are also present. At birth or in childhood, classic features of Cowden's include pigmented genital lesions, lipomas, epidermal nevi, and cafe-au-lait spots. Squamous cell carcinomas of the skin may also occur.

Thyroid

Two thirds of patients have thyroid disorders, and these typically include benign follicular adenomas or multinodular goiter of the thyroid. Additionally, Cowden's patients are more susceptible to developing thyroid cancer than the general population. It is estimated that less than 10 percent of individuals with Cowden syndrome may develop follicular thyroid cancer. Cases of papillary thyroid cancer have been reported as well.

Female and Male Genitourinary

Females have an elevated risk of developing endometrial cancers, which is highest for those under the age of 50. Currently, it is not clear whether uterine leiomyomata (fibroids) or congenital genitourinary abnormalities occur at an increased rate in Cowden syndrome patients as compared to the general population. The occurrence of multiple testicular lipomas, or testicular lipomatosis, is a characteristic finding in male patients with Cowden syndrome.

Gastrointestinal

Polyps are extremely common as they are found in about 95% of Cowden syndrome patients undergoing a colonoscopy. They are numerous ranging from a few to hundreds, usually of the hamartomatous subtype, and distributed across the colon as well as other areas within the gastrointestinal tract. Other types of polyps that may be encountered less frequently include ganglioneuromatous, adenomatous, and lymphoid polyps. Diffuse glycogenic acanthosis of the esophagus is another gastrointestinal manifestation associated with Cowden syndrome.

Breast

Females are at an increased risk of developing breast cancer, which is the most common malignancy observed in Cowden's patients. Although some cases have been reported, there is not enough evidence to indicate an association between Cowden syndrome and the development of male breast cancer. Up to 75% demonstrate benign breast conditions such as intraductal papillomatosis, fibroadenomas, and fibrocystic changes. However, there is currently not enough evidence to determine if benign breast disease occurs more frequently in Cowden's patients as compared to individuals without a hereditary cancer syndrome.

Central Nervous System

Macrocephaly is observed in 84% of patients with Cowden syndrome. It typically occurs due to an abnormally enlarged brain, or megalencephaly. Patients may also exhibit dolichocephaly. Varying degrees of autism spectrum disorder and intellectual disability have been reported as well. Lhermitte-Duclos disease is a benign cerebellar tumor that typically does not manifest until adulthood in patients with Cowden syndrome.

Genetics
Cowden syndrome is inherited in an autosomal dominant fashion. Germline mutations in PTEN (phosphatase and tensin homolog), a tumor suppressor gene, are found in up to 80% of Cowden's patients. Several other hereditary cancer syndromes, such as Bannayan-Riley-Ruvalcaba syndrome, have been associated with mutations in the PTEN gene as well. PTEN negatively regulates the cytoplasmic receptor tyrosine kinase pathway, which is responsible for cell growth and survival, and also functions to repair errors in DNA. Thus, in the absence of this protein, cancerous cells are more likely to develop, survive, and proliferate.

Recently, it was discovered that germline heterozygous mutations in SEC23B, a component of coat protein complex II vesicles secreted from the endoplasmic reticulum, are associated with Cowden syndrome. A possible interplay between PTEN and SEC23B has recently been suggested, given emerging evidence of each having a role in ribosome biogenesis, but this has not been conclusively determined.

Diagnosis 
The revised clinical criteria for the diagnosis of Cowden's syndrome for an individual is dependent on either one of the following: 1) 3 major criteria are met or more that must include macrocephaly, Lhermitte-Duclos, or GI hamartomas 2) two major and three minor criteria. The major and minor criteria are listed below:

Screening
The management of Cowden syndrome centers on the early detection and prevention of cancer types that are known to occur as part of this syndrome. Specific screening guidelines for Cowden syndrome patients have been published by the National Comprehensive Cancer Network (NCCN). Surveillance focuses on the early detection of breast, endometrial, thyroid, colorectal, renal, and skin cancer.  See below for a complete list of recommendations from the NCCN:

Treatment 
Malignancies that occur in Cowden syndrome are usually treated in the same fashion as those that occur sporadically in patients without a hereditary cancer syndrome. Two notable exceptions are breast and thyroid cancer. In Cowden syndrome patients with a first-time diagnosis of breast cancer, treatment with mastectomy of the involved breast as well as prophylactic mastectomy of the uninvolved contralateral breast should be considered. In the setting of thyroid cancer or a follicular adenoma, a total thyroidectomy is recommended even in cases where it appears that only one lobe of the thyroid is affected. This is due to the high likelihood of recurrence as well as the difficulty in distinguishing a benign from malignant growth with a hemithyroidectomy alone.

The benign mucocutaneous lesions observed in Cowden syndrome are typically not treated unless they become symptomatic or disfiguring. If this occurs, numerous treatment options, including topical agents, cryosurgery, curettage, laser ablation, and excision, may be utilized.

History
Cowden Syndrome was described in 1963, when Lloyd and Dennis described a novel inherited disease that predisposed to cancer. It was named after the Cowden family, in which it was discovered. They described the various clinical features including "adenoid facies; hypoplasia of the mandible and maxilla; a high-arch palate; hypoplasia of the soft palate and uvula; microstomia; papillomatosis of the lips and oral pharynx; scrotal tongue; [and] multiple thyroid adenomas."

The genetic basis of Cowden Syndrome was revealed in 1997, when germline mutations in a locus at 10q23 were associated to the novel PTEN tumor suppressor.

See also 
 List of cutaneous neoplasms associated with systemic syndromes

References

Further reading

External links 

 GeneReviews/NCBI/NIH/UW entry on PTEN Hamartoma Tumor Syndrome (PHTS)

Deficiencies of intracellular signaling peptides and proteins
Hereditary cancers
Rare syndromes
Epidermal nevi, neoplasms, and cysts
Syndromes affecting the breast
Syndromes affecting the gastrointestinal tract